Charles Francis Horne (January 12, 1870 – September 13, 1942) was an American author. He wrote or edited more than one hundred books, mostly multi-volume history works. He was a Professor of English at City College of New York.

Horne was born in Jersey City, New Jersey. He died in Annapolis, Maryland.

Books

Horne's most notable works include:
 The Code of Hammurabi 
 Great Men and Famous Women
 Sacred Books and Early Literature of the East, 14 volumes (1917)
 The Great Events by Famous Historians
 The Works of Jules Verne, 15 volumes (1911)
 The Protevangelium or Original Gospel of James
 Source Records of the Great War 
 The Stories of the Greatest Nations (with Edward S. Ellis) 
 Spain: The Story of a Great Nation (with Ellis) 
 Russia: The Story of a Great Nation (with Ellis)

External links

 
 
 
 
 

1870 births
1942 deaths
American biographers
American male biographers
American essayists
American historians
American male essayists